Mansfield is a village in Piatt County, Illinois in the United States. The population was 906 at the 2010 census.

History
Mansfield was originally incorporated around 1870. The village may have been named for John Mansfield, an officer in the Civil War. Other sources suggest Mansfield was named after a number of other unrelated men named Mansfield, including Jared Mansfield, an early American surveyor, or J.L. Mansfield, a local philanthropist. The village may also have been named after the city of Mansfield, Ohio – which was itself named for the surveyor Jared Mansfield.

Geography
Mansfield is located at  (40.212795, -88.507416).

Demographics

As of the census of 2000, there were 949 people, 396 households, and 293 families residing in the village. The racial makeup of the village was 98.95% White, 0.53% Asian, and 0.53% from two or more races. Hispanic or Latino of any race were 0.63% of the population.

There were 396 households, out of which 31.3% had children under the age of 18 living with them, 63.4% were married couples living together, 7.3% had a female householder with no husband present, and 25.8% were non-families. 22.5% of all households were made up of individuals, and 9.1% had someone living alone who was 65 years of age or older. The average household size was 2.40 and the average family size was 2.79.

In the village, the population was spread out, with 22.9% under the age of 18, 7.5% from 18 to 24, 29.4% from 25 to 44, 27.4% from 45 to 64, and 12.9% who were 65 years of age or older. The median age was 39 years. For every 100 females, there were 94.1 males. For every 100 females age 18 and over, there were 92.1 males.

The median income for a household in the village was $43,942, and the median income for a family was $48,393. Males had a median income of $32,042 versus $23,047 for females. The per capita income for the village was $20,947. About 1.4% of families and 3.9% of the population were below the poverty line, including 4.6% of those under age 18 and 1.6% of those age 65 or over.

Education
Mansfield is home to Blue Ridge Intermediate Junior High School which is part of Blue Ridge Community Unit School District 18. Elementary and High School age students attend Ruth M. Schneider Elementary School and Blue Ridge High School in nearby Farmer City.

References

External links 
VillageofMansfield.net

Villages in Illinois
Villages in Piatt County, Illinois